The Visio Karoli or Caroli ("Vision of Charles") may refer to either of two pieces of early medieval visionary literature:
Visio Karoli Magni, about a dream of Charlemagne
Visio Karoli Grossi, about a dream of Charles the Fat